Kelly Ringstad  (born 1 March 1974) is a Canadian freestyle skier. She was born in Vancouver, British Columbia. She competed at the 2002 Winter Olympics in Salt Lake City, in women's moguls.

References

External links 
 

1974 births
Skiers from Vancouver
Living people
Canadian female freestyle skiers
Olympic freestyle skiers of Canada
Freestyle skiers at the 2002 Winter Olympics